Sargon II's Prisms are two Assyrian tablet inscriptions describing Sargon II's (722 to 705 BC) campaigns, discovered in Nineveh in the Library of Ashurbanipal. The Prisms today are in the British Museum.

An excerpt of the text as translated by Luckenbill as below:
"... Philistia, Judah, Edom, Moab ...".

Known fragments

Prism A
 K. 1668b + DT6: four columns, with 15, 42, 48 and 19 lines

Prism B fragments
 (A) K. 1668a + K. 1671: two columns, with 64 and 63 lines
 (B) K. 1672: two columns, with 9 and 8 lines
 (H) K. 1669: one column, 34 lines, in 2 sections

Text
Here is some of the text from journal article : Inscribed Prisms of Sargon II from Nimrud (https://www.jstor.org/stable/4199590)

Sargon, great king, mighty king....king of Sumer and Akkad. 
Favourite of the great gods; upon me
the gods Assur, Nabu and Marduk
Bestowed a kingdom without peer and 
promoted the favourable calling of my name to the highest place.
who took care of Sippar, Nippur, Babylon, and Brosippa, 
talents of gold
730 talents shekel (of silver?) for the work upon Esarra the shrine of the god Assur I (laid out?)
and make it shine like the light of day.
With 16 ta(lents of) bright (gold)....

(The man of Sa)maria who with a king
(hostile to) me had consorted together not to do service and not to bring tribute and they did battle
in the strength of the great gods, my lords
I clashed with them
7280 people with (their) chariots
and the gods their trust, as a spoil I counted, 200 chariots as my royal muster. 
I mustered from among them
the rest of them
I caused to take their dwelling in the midst of Assyria
The city of Samaria I restored and greater than before
I caused it to become. People of lands conquered by my two hands
I brought within it; my officer
as prefect over them I placed, and
together with the people of Assyria I counted them
The people of the land of Musur and the Arabians
I caused the blaze of Ashur my lord to overwhelm them...

See also
 Annals of Sargon II

External links
 The Prism in the British Museum
 The Assyrian Eponym Canon, George Smith, 1875, page 129
 Catalogue of the cuneiform tablets https://archive.org/details/catalogueofcunei00brituoft

 http://www.isaiah666.com/sargon_annals.pdf Palestine

References

8th-century BC inscriptions
Assyrian stelas
Assyrian inscriptions
History of Palestine (region)
Library of Ashurbanipal
Sargon II